Keith Arlington Patrick Sandiford GCM (born 2 March 1936) is a Barbadian-born Canadian historian. He has been professor emeritus at the University of Manitoba since 2002.

Life and career
Keith Sandiford was born in Barbados and educated at Combermere School in Bridgetown. He received a BA from the University College of West Indies in 1960, an MA from the University of Toronto in 1961, and a PhD from the University of Toronto in 1966. He married Lorraine Small in 1963, and they have two children.
 
Keith Sandiford taught history at the University of Manitoba from 1966 to 1998, chaired the Teaching Advisory Committee from 1986 to 1993, and has been professor emeritus since 2002. He received the Gold Crown of Merit from the Government of Barbados in 2004. He specialises in social history of the 19th and 20th centuries, with a particular interest in the importance of cricket in society. He says, "Having visited several parts of the Commonwealth in the twentieth century, I remain convinced that Bradman, Grace, and Sobers are immeasurably more important in the overall scheme of things than Disraeli, Gladstone, and Palmerston."

Books

 Great Britain and the Schleswig-Holstein Question: A Study in Diplomacy, Politics, and Public Opinion (1975)
 100 Years of Organised Cricket in Barbados, 1892–1992 (1992; edited with Ronald Hughes and Carlisle Burton)
 Cricket and the Victorians (1994)
 Everton DeCourcey Weekes (1995)
 Combermere School and the Barbadian Society (1995; with Earle H. Newton)
 Clyde Leopold Walcott (1996)
 Frank Worrell (1997)
 Cricket Nurseries of Colonial Barbados: The Elite Schools, 1865–1966 (1998)
 Gary Sobers (1998)
 The Imperial Game: Cricket, Culture and Society (1998; edited with Brian Stoddart) 
 Cassius: From Wharf Boy to Role Model: The Life and Times of an Extraordinary Barbadian (2000)
 Wes Hall (2001)
 At the Crease with Gary Sobers: His Partnerships in Test Cricket (2001)
 J. D. C. Goddard (2002) 
 The Three Ws of West Indian Cricket: A Comparative Batting Analysis (2002; with Arjun Tan)
 25 Years of Pride and Industry: The Barbados Association of Winnipeg, Inc., 1977–2002 (2002)
 Caribbean Millennium Project: Impact of Caribbean Immigration on the Development of Manitoba 1950–2002 (2002)
 Sonny Ramadhin (2003)
 75 Years of West Indies Cricket: 1928–2003 (2004; with Ray Goble)
 Roy Edwin Marshall (2005)
 Alfred Lewis Valentine (2006)
 Cricket at Kensington, 1895–2005 (2006; with Carlisle Burton) 
 A Black Studies Primer: Heroes and Heroines of the African Diaspora (2008)
 Some Barbadian-Canadians: A Biographical Dictionary (2010; editor-in-chief)

His books on the West Indian cricketers Weekes, Walcott, Worrell, Sobers, Hall, Goddard, Ramadhin, Marshall and Valentine are short volumes in the Famous Cricketers series published by The Association of Cricket Statisticians and Historians.

References

1936 births
Living people
21st-century Canadian historians
Barbadian emigrants to Canada
Social historians
People educated at Combermere School
Alumni of University of London Worldwide
Alumni of the University of London
University of the West Indies alumni
University of Toronto alumni
Academic staff of the University of Manitoba
20th-century Canadian historians
Barbadian historians
Barbadian male writers
Cricket historians and writers
Sports historians